Alen Avdić (born 3 April 1977) is a Bosnian-Herzegovinian retired footballer who last played for FK Sarajevo.

Club career
He was active for Saba Battery FC in Iran's Premier Football League, Cercle Brugge and FC Denderleeuw in Belgian second division, Chemnitzer FC in the German second tier, Avispa Fukuoka of J2 League and Suwon Samsung Bluewings of K-league. In 2009, he returned  to his country and signed for the best known Bosnian football team, FK Sarajevo. He scored the second goal in the second leg match against Helsingborgs IF in the UEFA Europa League third round. FK Sarajevo won 2–1, 5–4 after penalty shootout.

International career
Avdić made his debut for Bosnia and Herzegovina in a March 1999 friendly match against Hungary and has earned a total of 3 caps, scoring no goals. His final international was an October 1999 European Championship qualification match against Estonia.

Club statistics

National team statistics

References

External links

Cerclemuseum.be 

1977 births
Living people
Footballers from Sarajevo
Association football forwards
Bosnia and Herzegovina footballers
Bosnia and Herzegovina under-21 international footballers
Bosnia and Herzegovina international footballers
FK Sarajevo players
Sakaryaspor footballers
Cercle Brugge K.S.V. players
Chemnitzer FC players
Suwon Samsung Bluewings players
Avispa Fukuoka players
Liaoning F.C. players
Saba players
Bargh Shiraz players
Premier League of Bosnia and Herzegovina players
Süper Lig players
Challenger Pro League players
2. Bundesliga players
K League 1 players
J2 League players
Chinese Super League players
Persian Gulf Pro League players
Bosnia and Herzegovina expatriate footballers
Expatriate footballers in Turkey
Bosnia and Herzegovina expatriate sportspeople in Turkey
Expatriate footballers in Belgium
Bosnia and Herzegovina expatriate sportspeople in Belgium
Expatriate footballers in Germany
Bosnia and Herzegovina expatriate sportspeople in Germany
Expatriate footballers in South Korea
Bosnia and Herzegovina expatriate sportspeople in South Korea
Expatriate footballers in Japan
Bosnia and Herzegovina expatriate sportspeople in Japan
Expatriate footballers in China
Bosnia and Herzegovina expatriate sportspeople in China
Expatriate footballers in Iran
Bosnia and Herzegovina expatriate sportspeople in Iran